The Wibault 313, Wibault Wib 313 or Penhoët Wibault Wib 313 was a single engine, single seat low wing monoplane fighter aircraft, designed and built in France in the early 1930s. It was entered into a government competitive tender programme but was not ordered.

Design and development

The Wib 313 was designed for the 1930 Service Technique de l'Aéronautique (S.T.Aé, Technical Department of Aeronautics) single-seat fighter (C.1) programme.  It was a low wing cantilever monoplane, as were all its many competitors but unlike the others it was powered by a radial engine. It also moved away from Wibault's tradition of angular wing plans and empennages and flat sided fuselages.  It was designed and constructed by Avions Michel Wibault, though the company merged with Chantiers de Saint-Nazaire, forming Chantiers Aéronautiques Wibault-Penhoët before the Wib 313 was completed.

The Wib 313 was an all-metal aircraft.  Its wings, mounted with mild dihedral, were straight edged and tapered with rounded wing tips.  Narrow chord ailerons occupied about three-quarters of the trailing edges. The tail surfaces were also straight tapered and round tipped; the fin was tall and the  rudder ended at the top of the fuselage, with the tailplane mounted about halfway up the fuselage.  The latter was oval in cross section, with a slightly humped upper line. The cockpit was placed at the highest point, just ahead of the wing trailing edge. The fighter's  nine cylinder Gnome-Rhône 9Kbrs radial engine was neatly enclosed within a short cowling and drove a variable-pitch propeller, a novelty at the time. The Wib 313's fixed, conventional undercarriage was wide track, the mainwheels enclosed in fairings and attached to the wings by vertical, faired legs which were cross braced to the central fuselage underside. There was a small tailskid.  A  7.7 mm (0.303 in) unsynchronised Darne machine gun in a shallow fairing was mounted outboard of each undercarriage leg, firing outside the propeller arc.

The Wib 313 was flown for the first time in late November 1932 at Villacoublay and competitive flight testing continued until September 1933, when it was returned to the factory for modifications. The fighter had returned to Villacoublay by December but by then a contract had been awarded for the Dewoitine D.500; the Wib 313 was criticized for its poor rate of climb and limited pilot's view.  Development work on the Wib 313 ended the following month.

Specifications

References

Bibliography

1930s French fighter aircraft
Wib 313
Single-engined tractor aircraft
Low-wing aircraft